"Watawi" is a song by Nigerian singer and songwriter CKay, featuring fellow Nigerian singer Davido, alongside a South African rapper Focalistic, and record producer Abidoza. It was released on 17 June 2022, by Warner Music Africa. "Watawi" was written by CKay, Davido, Focalistic, and Abidoza, who also produced the song. It accompanied by a music video directed by Dalia Dias. It debuted at number 13 on the TurnTable Top 50, number 21 on the US Billboard Afrobeats Songs chart, and number 6 on the UK Afrobeats Singles Chart.

On 21 June 2022, The Fader music editor, Jordan Darville, gave an illustration of the definition of "Watawi", slang for "What Are We?". The music editor further wrote, "A lot of people have been in tricky situations when their 'situationship' attempts to push things further than it needs to be". On 22 June 2022, CKay performed "Watawi" for the first time in Paris, France.

Music video
On 17 June 2022, the song was accompanied by a music video directed by Dalia Dias, and shot in South Africa.

Commercial performance
"Watawi" peaked at number 6 on the UK Afrobeats Singles Chart. On 28 June 2022, it debuted at number 13 on the Nigeria TurnTable Top 50. "Watawi" also peaked at number 11 on TurnTable Top 50 streaming songs chart, and TurnTable Top 50 Airplay chart. On 28 June 2022, it debuted at number 21 on the US Billboard Afrobeats Songs chart. "Watawi" has received one million Boomplay streams, and 1.2 million Spotify streams as of 29 June 2022. In 2022, "Watawi" was shortlisted on OkayAfrica Heat of the Week.

Credits and personnel
 CKay – vocals, songwriting, production
 Davido – vocals, songwriting
 Focalistic – vocals, songwriting
 Abidoza - songwriting, production

Charts

Release history

References

2022 songs
2022 singles
African electronic dance music
CKay songs
Songs written by Davido